Jagoda Kibil (born 15 August 1999) is a Polish Paralympic athlete who competes in sprinting events in international level events. Her twin brother Daniel Kibil is also a Paralympic athlete who competes at national level.

She and her twin brother suffered cerebral hypoxia due to complications at birth which caused them both to have cerebral palsy.

References

1999 births
Living people
People from Kozienice
Paralympic athletes of Poland
Polish female sprinters
Medalists at the World Para Athletics Championships
Medalists at the World Para Athletics European Championships
Athletes (track and field) at the 2020 Summer Paralympics
20th-century Polish women
21st-century Polish women